The Shamakhy Astrophysical Observatory, named after Nasreddin Tusi of the National Academy of Sciences of Azerbaijan (ANAS ShAO), was established on November 17, 1959, by decree No. 975 of the Council of Ministers of the Azerbaijan SSR. ShAO operates as a research institute within the ANAS Department of Physical, Mathematical, and Technical Sciences. The Observatory is located in the north-east of the Greater Caucasus Range, 150 km from the city of Baku, in the eastern part of Mount Pirkuli, at an altitude of 1435–1500 m above sea level, in geographical coordinates λ = 48⁰ 35' 04" E, φ = 40⁰ 46 '20"N. Here the number of clear nights suitable for observation reaches 150-180 per year.

History

In 1927, the Astronomical Expedition was created to study the astroclimate in several regions of Azerbaijan. In Kalbajar, Lachin, Shamakhy, Khizi, and other regions of Azerbaijan, work was underway to select a suitable place for the future foundation of an astronomical observatory. As a result of research, in 1953, it was planned to build an observation base and then an observatory in the Pirqulu village of the Shamakhy region. The Observatory functioned as the department of Astrophysics within the Institute of Physics and Mathematics of the Azerbaijan  Academy of Sciences and then, in 1956, as the Sector of Astrophysics of the Academy of Sciences. Since 1960, the Observatory has been included in the Azerbaijan Academy of Sciences with the status of an independent research institute. Academician H.F.Sultanov, who contributed significantly to creating the Shamakhy Astrophysical Observatory, worked as the observatory director from 1960-to 1981. Under his organization and leadership in 1953–1959, along with astronomical observations, serious work was carried out on the design of the future Observatory, the acquirement of telescopes and other equipment, the Observatory's structure, and the training of staff in the field of astronomy. In addition, eminent scientists M.M.Aliyev, Y.X.Mamedaliev, X.M. Abdullaev, R.E. Huseynov, and G.J. Mammadbayli played an essential role in creating and developing ShAO. In the training of scientific staff should be noted the work of employees of the Moscow State University named after M. V. Lomonosov, Leningrad State University named after A. S. Pushkin, Pulkovo Astronomical Observatory of RAS, the Crimean Astrophysical Observatory of RAS, the Institute of Terrestrial Magnetism, Ionosphere and Radiowave Propagation named after N.V.Pushkov (IZMIRAN). In 1957, the first telescope, the Chromospheric-Photospheric Solar Telescope, was installed at the Pirgulu Astronomical Station. In 1959, a 200-mm photoelectric telescope was put into operation, with the help of which the problem of studying the astroclimate of the area was solved. In subsequent years, the following telescopes were put into operation: the Horizontal Solar Telescope (1962), the AST-452 Telescope (1964), the AZT-8 Telescope (1970), and the Zeiss-600 Telescope (1980). Special meaning in supplying the Shamakhy Astrophysical Observatory is the acquisition of a telescope with a mirror diameter of 2 m, put into operation in September 1966. Produced by the company "Carl Zeiss" of the German Democratic Republic, this telescope is the third-largest in the former USSR after two identical Russian-made 2.6-meter telescopes installed at the Crimean Astrophysical Observatory of the RAS and the Byurakan Astrophysical Observatory. A unique role in acquiring and putting this famous optical telescope into operation, considered the flagship of experimental science in Azerbaijan, was played by the former president of the Azerbaijan Academy of Sciences, academician Yusif Mammadaliyev and the former vice-president, people's poet Samad Vurgun. From 1960 to 1980, regular astrophysical observations were carried out at ShAO. In the same years, much attention was paid to staff training in astrophysics. 
For this purpose, by a particular order of the national leader Haydar Aliyev, in 1976, the Department of Astrophysics was established at the Azerbaijan State University. This department played an important role in training qualified personnel in astronomy. In 1981, by the decision of the Cabinet of Ministers, the Shamakhy Astrophysical Observatory was named after the great Azerbaijani astronomer Nasreddin Tusi. In 1973, the Batabat department, located in the Nakhchivan Autonomous Republic, was merged with the ShAO. In 1997, the Aghdara observational station, which operated on the territory of the Nakhchivan Autonomous Republic during the Soviet period and became the proprietorship of the Azerbaijani state after gaining independence, was also transferred to the balance sheet of the ShAO. According to the order of our national leader Haydar Aliyev dated August 7, 2002, "On the establishment of the Nakhchivan branch of the National Academy of Sciences of Azerbaijan," the Batabat Astrophysical Observatory, together with the Aghdara observational station was transferred to the Nakhchivan branch of the National Academy of Sciences of Azerbaijan, and now operates as an independent observatory. Here, processing and analysis of observational materials and research in theoretical astrophysics are carried out. BCB is particularly important in coordinating the observatory activities and its collaboration with other structures and research institutes of ANAS and with the city's universities. Here, dissertations are defended, regular scientific seminars are held, scientific journals of the Observatory are issued, and the official website is managed.
In September 2008, the observatory underwent major repairs.

Observatory directors
 1959-1981- Acedemician Sultanov Hajibay Farajulla oglu;
 1981-1982- Doctor of physical-mathematical sciences Huseynov Oktay Khansafar oglu
 1982-1985-Ph.D. in physical-mathematical sciences Abbasov Alik Rza oglu;
 1985-1986-Ph.D. in physical-mathematical sciences Ismailov Zohrab Abbasali oglu;
 1986-1988-Ph.D. in physical-mathematical sciences Rustamov Kamran Ahmad oglu;
 1988-1997-PhD in physics and mathematics Ehmedov Shmidt Bunyad oglu;
 1997-2015-Corresponding Member of ANAS Doctor of physical-mathematical sciences Quliyev Eyyub Salah oglu;
 From 2015 to the present, Corresponding Member of ANAS Doctor of physical-mathematical sciences Jalilov Namig Sardar oglu.

Telescopes
The observatory measured the light polarization of Comet d'Arrest during the Soviet period. 
The reflector with a diameter of 2 meters was manufactured by the German company "Carl Zeiss JENA" and put into operation in 1966. The main mirror is parabolic, D=2080 mm, F=9000 mm. The main article: 2 meters telescope
Telescope AZT-8, the main mirror is parabolic D=700 mm, F=2820 mm. The first Cassegrain system F=11200 mm, relative aperture 1:16 and angle of view 40' or 13x13 cm2. 
Telescope Zeiss-600, the main mirror is parabolic D=600 mm, F=2400 mm; Cassegrain system Feqv = 7500 mm.
AST-452, Maksutov-Cassegrain meniscus telescope, meniscus lens D=350 mm, mirror D=490 mm, spotting scope F=1200 mm. The scale on the focal surface of the telescope is 2.86'/mm. The luminous intensity of the telescope is 1:3.4. The telescope can operate in 2 optical systems: Primary focus and Newtonian focus. The angle of view at the primary focus is 4°14', the linear size of the field is 90 mm, and at the Newton, the focus is 2°52' and 60 mm, respectively.  
Azimuthal coelostat ASK-5, main mirror D=440 mm, Newton's mirror D=200 mm, F=17500 mm. 
AFR-3 Chromospheric-Photospheric Telescope, objective D=130 mm, Feq=9000 mm.
The AZT-15 telescope, a 1-meter Schmidt system, was brought to the Observatory in 1975, but the telescope was not installed yet due to the disappearance of the main mirror for unknown reasons. The rest of the telescope equipment is stored in the warehouse at the ShAO. The Observatory administration is negotiating with the leadership of the Russian Academy of Sciences on the installation of the telescope jointly with Russia.

Light-receivers and other devices

The 2-meter telescope has the following light receivers:

Canberra spectrograph with 2x2 prism - for spectral observation of faint objects;

Three-chamber and two-diffraction spectrograph of the primary focus;

Cassegrain focus spectrograph of medium resolution;

CCD photometer BVRc for studying faint objects;

Coudé focus of Echelle spectrograph

SHAFES - high resolution fiber optic spectrograph for Cassegrain focus (R = 56000, 28000, λ 3700-9000Å);

UAGS + Canon + CCD Andor - for spectral observation of faint objects;

CCD photometer operating on BVRcIC system used on Zeiss-600 telescope; The telescope is equipped with a Celestron F/6.3 focus reducer, the optical power increased by 1.6 times.

ASP-20 spectrograph with F = 7000 mm in ASG coelostat; D = 1.12 Å/mm, λ 3600-7000 Å;

Two objective prisms with refraction angles of 15˚ and 35˚40' using on the AST-452 telescope;

Aluminizing vacuum installation;

In 2012, a cryogenic installation for the production of liquid nitrogen LNP-20 was installed and put into operation for cooling CCD light receivers.

In 2007, a German-made B-240 vacuum apparatus was put into operation for aluminizing the surface of astronomical mirrors.

Acting departments 
 Galaxies and star formation processes;
 Binary stars and eruptive processes;
 Physics of Stellar Atmospheres and Magnetism;
 Astronomical devices and innovative technologies; 
 Theoretical astrophysics and cosmology;
 Cosmic plasma and helio-geophysical problems;
 Planets and small celestial bodies.

Scientific achievements 

In theoretical works on stellar physics, new conclusions were drawn about the physical nature of the end product of stellar evolution. It is shown that during the collapse, during the formation of a neutron star, a flux of neutrinos and antineutrinos with an energy of 50 eV is formed. The neutron star formed during the collapse increases the energy of the neutrino formed at the center and creates a soft X-ray spectrum. The parameters of the neutron star formed using the relativistic theory were calculated. These results were used at the Baksan Neutrino Observatory. It is shown that even very massive stars go through a pre-collapse stage in their evolution. It is proven that supergiant outbursts of types I and II differ in energy and mass. A catalog of about 700 strong X-ray emitting sources was compiled for the first time. For the first time in the Galaxy, the electron concentration of 331 pulsars was determined.
It is shown that pulsars are located in a ring 8 km/s thick from the Galaxy's center. Based on this, the distance to the pulsars and its several parameters were found.
A new scale of distances to planetary nebulae was determined for the first time. Most of the obtained results were confirmed by observations.    
Solar observations have been carried out since 1957, and the results are published in international catalogs.
A model of solar flares using the theory of shock waves is given.  
The MHD theory of global vortex Rossby-type fluctuations of the Sun was developed. It is shown that global vortices, changing the rate of the thermonuclear fusion process in the center and the optical properties of the Sun's surface, change quasi-periodically the integral emanation flux of the Sun. The obtained results have been put forward as a critical mechanism for global climate change on the Earth for the first time.
A physical mechanism for solving the Solar neutrino deficiency problem was put forward. The fundamentals of forming an MHD resonator in the central oblast and the noise oscillation (type change) of an electron neutrino passing through it were developed. This mechanism can be used to diagnose the physical state of the center of the Sun and explain the asymmetry of the Solar neutrino flux observed at the poles and equator. In addition, the mechanisms of large-scale low-frequency turbulence formation in the solar wind plasma, its nature, and its impact on terrestrial ecosystems and biosystems were studied.
It is shown that the brightness of details on the surface of Mars is constantly changing, and dust particles in its atmosphere are formed and disappear. The deficiency of Nitrogen oxide molecules in the atmosphere of Mars was shown as one of the main reasons. A topographic map of Mars was compiled, and the clearness of its atmosphere was studied.
Emission lines were detected in the spectrum of the dark surface of Venus, proving that lightning strikes the planet's atmosphere.
Based on statistical research of asteroids, Olbers' theory which states that asteroids were formed due to the collapse of a big body, was refuted. 
A new theory of comet fragmentation was proposed. The concept of the formation of hyperbolic comets and meteors was given.
Many non-stationary stars' atmosphere changes (T Taurus, Ae Be Herbig, Wolf-Ray, symbiotic, giant, magnetic stars) were investigated.    
The photometric light curves of Sun-type young stars were classified. It is shown that there are only five types of light curves depending on the activity mechanisms.
For some stars, short-term changes were explained by the star's rotation around its axis, and long-term changes were explained by binary or solar activity.
It was shown that the internal structure of stars above and below the main sequence is different. It was proven that White dwarfs have an inner core.
The spectral distribution of energy was observed in 5 absolute magnitudes of the flux 3200-7500Å of 425 bright stars, and its catalog was compiled.

Main scientific journal
Azerbaijan Astronomical Journal (in English)

Directions of modern research
 Solar physics - activity, atmosphere, mechanisms of solar-terrestrial relations.
 Young stars, supergiants, Wolf-Rayet, symbiotic, magnetic stars.
 The solar system bodies - planets, comets, and asteroids.   
 Active galactic nuclei, quasars  
 Some actual problems of theoreti
cal astrophysics and cosmology.

Eminent astronomers
 Hajibey Farajulla oglu Sultanov
 Nadir Baba oglu Ibragimov
 Huseynov Rahim Ayyub oglu
 Suleyman Gulu oglu Zeynalov
 Inglab Asad oglu Aslanov
 Zohrab Abbasali Ismailov
 Mammad Karimbekov
 Oktay Huseynov
 Teymur Aminzade
 Sarı Azimov
 Rahim Zeynalov
 Jafar Guluzade
 Khabibulla Mammadli

Great events
 Congress of the International Astronautical Federation (1972)
 International conferences on the study of magnetic stars (1973, 1976)
 Plenum of the Astronomical Council of the USSR Academy of Sciences (1984) 
 Assemblies "Tusi-800" (8 conferences for 1998–2002) 
 Periodicity and Cosmological Problems (2003) 
 International conference dedicated to the 60th anniversary of the ShAO (2019)
 Modern tr
ends in studies of physics and dynamics of the Solar system bodies. (2021)

See also
 List of astronomical observatories

References

External links

 Shao.az 

Astronomical observatories built in the Soviet Union
Astronomical observatories in Azerbaijan
1960 establishments in the Soviet Union
Buildings and structures completed in 1960
1960 establishments in Azerbaijan